The 2011-12 US Open Cup for Arena Soccer is the fourth edition of an open knockout style tournament for Arena/Indoor Soccer. Currently teams from the Professional Arena Soccer League, Premier Arena Soccer League, and other independent indoor soccer teams participate in the tournament.

US Open Arena Soccer Championship bracket

^Estimated Dates

Confirmed dates and matchups
All times local

Wild Card round
 Fri.Dec.9, 7:30pm - Louisville Lightning (PASL) 15, Indy Elite FC (PASL-Premier) 5
 Sat.Dec.10, 9:15pm - Cincinnati Kings (PASL) 8, Cincinnati Saints (PASL-Premier) 4
 Tue.Dec.27, 7:05pm - San Diego Sockers (PASL) 9, Las Vegas Select (Independent) 4

Round of 16
 Sat.Nov.12, 4:05pm - Turlock Express (PASL) 8, Las Vegas Knights (PASL-Premier) 7
 Sat.Dec.3, 7:35pm - Detroit Waza (PASL) 12, World Latino League All-Stars (Independent) 2
 Sat.Dec.3, 8:00pm - Anaheim Bolts (PASL) 15, Docemas (Independent) 7
 Fri.Dec.30, 8:05pm - Cincinnati Kings (PASL) 9, Louisville Lightning (PASL) 3 (Doubles as regular season match)
 Fri.Jan.6th, 7:30pm - Denver Dynamite (PASL-Premier) 3, Colorado Blizzard (PASL-Premier) 0 (Forfeit- Regular Season Match Rescheduled)
 Sun.Jan.8, 12:00pm - San Diego Sockers (PASL) 10, Arizona Storm (PASL) 3 (Doubles as regular season match)
 Sun.Jan.8, 8:00pm - Vitesse Dallas (PASL-Premier) 7, Springfield Demize (PASL-Premier) 5

Quarterfinals
 Fri.Dec.16, 7:35pm - Turlock Express (PASL) 9, Anaheim Bolts (PASL) 8 (Doubles as regular season match)
 Sat.Jan.14, 7:00pm - San Diego Sockers (PASL) 13, Tacoma Stars (PASL) 6 (Doubles as regular season match)
 Sat.Jan.21, 8:00pm - Vitesse Dallas (PASL-Premier) 11, Denver Dynamite (PASL-Premier) 6
 Sat.Jan.28, 7:35pm - Cincinnati Kings (PASL) 7, Detroit Waza (PASL) 6 (Doubles as regular season match)

Semifinals
 Sat.Jan.21, 7:05pm - San Diego Sockers (PASL) 10, Turlock Express (PASL) 8 (Doubles as regular season match)
 Fri.Feb.17, 9:00pm - Cincinnati Kings (PASL) 10, Vitesse Dallas (PASL-Premier) 5

Finals
 Sat.Mar.17, 7:35pm - San Diego Sockers (PASL) 13, Cincinnati Kings (PASL) 6

Qualifying
Green indicates qualification for Qualifying Tournament Knockout Round(s)
Bold Indicates Qualifying Tournament Winner and qualification to US Arena Open Cup
All times local

Group Matches Sat. Oct. 15, 2011
Cincinnati Saints 5, Cincinnati Kings Reserves One 1
Cincinnati Kings Reserves One 5, Cincinnati Kings Reserves Two 3
Cincinnati Kings Reserves Two 4, Cincinnati Saints 3
Cincinnati Saints qualify for US Arena Open Cup Wild Card Round

Group Matches Sat. Oct. 22, 2011
9:00am - Los Bravos 6, Metro FC 1
10:00am - Evansville Crush 15, Beatdown City Blazers 0
11:00am - Louisville Rayo 21, Metro FC 0  
2:00pm - Cincinnati Kings Reserves One 7, Los Bravos 2
3:00pm  - Evansville Crush 1, Indy Elite  FC 1
4:00pm  - Cincinnati Kings Reserves Two 8, Beatdown City Blazers 1
5:00pm - Cincinnati Kings Reserves One 2, Louisville Rayo 1
6:00pm - Indy Elite FC 5, Cincinnati Kings Reserves Two 2

Group Matches Sun. Oct. 23, 2011
8:00am - Louisville Rayo 3, Los Bravos 0
9:00am - Evansville Crush 17, Metro FC 0
10:00am - Indy Elite  FC 6, Beatdown City Blazers 3

Semifinals Sun. Oct. 23, 2011
1:00pm - Indy Elite FC 4, Louisville Rayo 2 
2:00pm - Evansville Crush 7, Los Bravos 0 

Finals Sun. Oct. 23, 2011
4:00pm - Indy Elite  FC 1, Evansville Crush 1  (Indy Elite FC Wins Shootout, 2-0)
Indy Elite  FC qualify for US Arena Open Cup Wild Card Round

$ - Teams could not play Sunday, making them ineligible for the Semifinals and Finals

Group Matches Sat. Nov. 26, 2011
9:00am - Freekick 4, Anaheim Bolts Reserves Blue 4
10:00am - Anaheim Bolts Reserves White 6, Deft Touch 4 
11:00am - Freekick 3, Bench Warmers 0
12:00pm - Docemas 9, Deft Touch 1
1:00pm - Anaheim Bolts Reserves Blue 11, Bench Warmers 4
2:00pm - Anaheim Bolts Reserves White 5, Docemas 5

Wild Card Round Sun. Nov. 27, 2011
10:00am - Anaheim Bolts Reserves Blue 6, Deft Touch 3 
11:00am - Anaheim Bolts Reserves White 3, Bench Warmers 0 

Semifinals Sun. Nov. 27, 2011
12:00pm - Docemas 7, Anaheim Bolts Reserves Blue 2 
1:00pm -  Freekick 6, Anaheim Bolts Reserves White 1 

Finals Sun. Nov. 27, 2011
2:15pm - Docemas 4, Freekick 3 
Docemas qualify for US Arena Open Cup Round of 16

See also
2012 FIFRA Club Championship

References

United States Open Cup for Arena Soccer
United States Open Cup for Arena Soccer
Open Cup for Arena Soccer
Open Cup for Arena Soccer
2011–12 Professional Arena Soccer League season